Slaughterhouse is the only extended play by hip hop supergroup Slaughterhouse. It was released on February 8, 2011 through E1 Music. The album debuted at #132 on the Billboard charts, after having sold 5,100 copies.

Background
Speculation had been brewing for quite some time that the group would be signing with Shady Records, after the group made a cameo in the "Forever" music video. Throughout 2010, it was confirmed that the group would be signing to the label but multiple contractual obligations held the signing up. Despite the delay, it was confirmed on January 12, 2011 that the group had successfully signed to the label along with Alabama rapper Yelawolf, and the two acts would be appearing on the cover of the March issue of XXL along with Shady Records founder Eminem.

Singles
On January 10, 2011, the single "Back on the Scene" featuring Dres of Black Sheep was released on the internet. The following day, a remix to group member Joell Ortiz's song "Put Some Money On It" featuring rap group The LOX was also released as a single.

Reception

The EP has been met with strong reviews, with many critics stating that it is an improvement from the group's 2009 debut.

Commercial performance
As of April 2012, it has sold 15,198 copies in the United States.

Track listing
As confirmed by iTunes, co-writers by DiscoOS.

Personnel
By DiscoOS.

 Andres Titus: Composer, Performer
 Alonzo Mario Stevenson: Composer
 Andrew Kelley: Art Direction, Design
 Bob Perry: A&R
 Bryan Fryzel
 Chad Griffith: Photography
 David Styles: Composer, Performer
 Deleno Matthews: Composer
 Dominick Wickliffe: Composer, Performer
 Jason Phillips: Composer, Performer

 Joseph Budden: Composer, Performer
 Joell Ortiz: Composer, Performer
 KK Rosemond: A&R admin
 Levar Coppin: Composer
 Mark Landon: Composer
 Paul Grosso: Creative Direction
 Ryan Montgomery: Composer, Performer
 Sean Divine Jacobs: Composer, Performer
 Shawnte Crespo: Product Manager

References

2011 debut EPs
Shady Records EPs
Slaughterhouse (group) albums
E1 Music EPs